Kaspar Uttenhofer (1588 – 31 May 1621) was a German astronomer.

Life 
Kaspar Uttenhofer was born in Nuremberg in 1588, the seventh son of the second marriage of Georg Uttenhofer, a tailor. His father died on January 9, 1563, leaving the family in good economic conditions. One of his brothers was Anthoni Uttenhofer (1542-1609), an artist specialized in etching.

His personal life is little known, according to the mathematician Daniel Schwenter, Uttenhofer devoted most of his life to improving his knowledge being self-taught. He wrote various books, the most renowned is probably the Pes mechanicus in which the author explained how to easily build a sundial.

He wrote the Judicium de nupero Cometa astrologico-historicum after spotting comet (C/1618 W1) in the Boötes constellation. He died in his home city of Nuremberg in 1621.

Works 
 Pes Mechanicus. Oder Werckschuh/ Das ist: Ein gar leuchte Weise/ allerley gemeine Sonnen-Uhren auß einem außgetheilten Werckschuch zu machen Nürnberg: Halbmayer, 1615 
 Judicium de nupero Cometa Astrologo Historicum. Kurzer Bericht und Erklärung / Was von dem neuen Cometen / oder geschwentzten Stern / so sich dieses zu endlauffenden 1618. Jars [...]zuhalten. Nürnberg: Simon Halbmayer, 1619

References 

17th-century German astronomers
1588 births
1621 deaths
Scientists from Nuremberg